Bobbie Allen known professionally as Young Summer, is an American singer, songwriter based out of Nashville, Tennessee.  Her first studio album, Siren, was released in August 2014. She released a single "Alright", June 2016 to rave reviews.

Her follow-up EP, You Would Have Loved It Here, was released October 2016.

She lists Karen Carpenter, David Bowie, Carole King, Michael Jackson, Prince as influences.

Allen co-wrote Echosmith's song, “Goodbye,” the lead single from their second studio album, Inside a Dream. 

Allen is currently working on a new album.

In 2019, Allen covered "Take Me Out" by Franz Ferdinand. Her version appears on the soundtrack for the Hulu TV series, Looking For Alaska, which is based on the 2005 novel by John Green.

Discography 
Studio Albums
 Siren (2014)
Extended Plays
 Fever Dream EP (2013)
 You Would Have Loved It Here (2017)
Singles
 The Emperor (Oct 23, 2020)
 If The World Falls To Pieces (Sept 25, 2020)
Old Chunk of Coal
 Echo
 Fallout 
 Paused Parade 
 Alright
 Taken
 Why Try
 Fever Dream

Songwriting Credits

References

American alternative rock musicians
Singers from Washington, D.C.
Synth-pop singers